Novo Basquete Brasil (NBB) is the Brazilian basketball league, created in 2008 as the new format to the Campeonato Brasileiro de Basquete. NBB is fully organized by the participating clubs, as an attempt to reorganize and rebuild the Brazilian basketball. The form of dispute follows a similar model adopted by the NBA and European countries. The first edition was disputed by fifteen teams playing each other in the round and second round at the classification stage. At the end of two rounds, the top eight teams qualify for the playoffs in best of five matches, advances to the next phase who win three games.

Participating teams 

 Winner Limeira
 Franca
 Paulistano
 Araraquara
 Assis Basket
 Bauru
 São José
 Pinheiros
 Flamengo
 Saldanha da Gama
 CETAF Vila Velha
 Brasília
 Joinville
 Bira-Lajeado
 Minas

Regular season 

Classification

Playoffs

Quarterfinals

Flamengo (1) vs. (8) Pinheiros

Game 1

Game 2

Game 3

Brasília (2) vs. (7) Franca

Game 1

Game 2

Game 3

Game 4

Game 5

Minas (3) vs. (6) Bauru

Game 1

Game 2

Game 3

Joinville (4) vs. (5) Limeira

Game 1

Game 2

Game 3

Game 4

Semifinals

Flamengo (1) vs. (4) Joinville

Game 1

Game 2

Game 3

Brasília (2) vs. Minas (3)

Game 1

Game 2

Game 3

Game 4

Finals

Game 1

Game 2

Game 3

Game 4

Game 5

Awards 
 MVP - Marcelinho Machado (Flamengo)
 Sixth Player - Fred Santos (Flamengo)
 Best Defender - Alex Garcia (Brasília)
 Coach - Paulo Sampaio (Flamengo)

All-Team

References

2008–09
NBB
Brazil